Apatelodes castanea is a moth in the family Apatelodidae first described by E. Dukinfield Jones in 1908. It is found in Paraná, Brazil.

The wingspan is about 40 mm. The forewings are chestnut brown with conspicuous dark slightly excurved ante- and post-medial lines. There is a minute white spot near the apex and a minute dark point on the discocellulars. The hindwings are chestnut-brown, but ochreous at the base.

References

External links 

Apatelodidae
Moths described in 1908